The 3rd Bersaglieri Regiment is an active unit of the Italian Army based in Teulada in Sardinia. The regiment is part of the army's infantry corps' Bersaglieri speciality and operationally assigned to the Mechanized Brigade "Sassari". The regiment is the highest decorated unit of the Italian Army with three Gold Medals of Military Valour, two of which the regiment earned during the Italian campaign in Ukraine and Russia in World War II.

Current structure 
As of 2019 the 3rd Bersaglieri Regiment consists of:

  Regimental Command, in Teulada
 Logistic Support Company
 18th Bersaglieri Battalion "Poggio Scanno"
 1st Fusiliers Company
 2nd Fusiliers Company
 3rd Fusiliers Company
 Maneuver Support Company

The Command and Logistic Support Company fields the following platoons: C3 Platoon, Transport and Materiel Platoon, Medical Platoon, and Commissariat Platoon. The regiment is equipped with VTLM Lince vehicles and Freccia wheeled infantry fighting vehicles. The Maneuver Support Company is equipped with 120mm mortars and Spike MR anti-tank guided missiles.

See also 
 Bersaglieri

External links
Italian Army Website: 3rd Bersaglieri Regiment

References

Bersaglieri Regiments of Italy